Sacred Hearts Academy, also known as Sacred Hearts or SHA, is located on 3253 Waialae Avenue, in the town of Kaimuki in Honolulu, Hawaii, is a historic Roman Catholic college preparatory school for girls founded in 1909 to serve the needs of early Hawaii Catholics in the former Territory of Hawaii. The school maintains a special relationship with Chaminade University of Honolulu and the all-boys Saint Louis School, both administered by the Society of Mary.

History
Sacred Hearts was originally founded by nuns from the Congregation of the Sacred Hearts of Jesus and Mary, the religious order of Father Damien. The precursor of the institution was founded as a boarding and day school next to the Cathedral Basilica of Our Lady of Peace in Honolulu in 1859.

The current manifestation was founded in 1909 as a boarding school, it grew rapidly within the next decade and, by the 1920s, more buildings were added to accommodate the students. The sisters ran the school until 1990, when it passed into lay administration.

Filming location
Sacred Hearts has served as a filming location for several television shows set and shot on location in Hawaii. The season 6 finale of the ABC series Lost was filmed there. In Hawaii Five-0, Sacred Hearts was used as Grace Williams' school.

Alumnae
 Tia Carrere, actress, singer and model
 Nora Stewart Coleman, former First Lady of American Samoa
 Amata Coleman Radewagen, Congressional delegate from American Samoa
 Loretta Fuddy, director of the Hawaii Department of Health (2011–2013)
 Elizabeth Kahanu Kalanianaʻole, Hawaiian princess
 Rosalie Keliʻinoi, first elected female Hawaii Territorial legislator in 1925
 Likelike, Hawaiian princess
 Emma Kaili Metcalf Beckley Nakuina, early female judge and cultural writer of Hawaii
 Faith Rivera, singer-songwriter

See also
 Roman Catholic Diocese of Honolulu

Notes and references

External links
 Sacred Hearts Alumni Reunions and Information
 Sacred Hearts Alumni Community
 Congregation of the Sacred Hearts of Jesus and Mary, SS.CC.
 Roman Catholic Diocese of Honolulu

Roman Catholic Diocese of Honolulu
Sacred Heart schools in the United States
Catholic secondary schools in Hawaii
Educational institutions established in 1909
Girls' schools in Hawaii
Private K-12 schools in Honolulu
1909 establishments in Hawaii